The 2011 NCAA Division III football season, part of the college football season organized by the NCAA at the Division III level in the United States, began in August 2011, and concluded with the NCAA Division III Football Championship, also known as the Stagg Bowl, in December 2011 at Salem Football Stadium in Salem, Virginia. The Wisconsin–Whitewater Warhawks won their fourth, and third consecutive, Division III championship by defeating the Mount Union Purple Raiders, 13−10. This was the seventh of seven straight championship games between Mount Union (3 wins) and Wisconsin–Whitewater (4 wins).

The Gagliardi Trophy, given to the most outstanding player in Division III football, was awarded to Michael Zweifel, wide receiver from Dubuque.

Conference standings

Conference champions

Postseason
The 2011 NCAA Division III Football Championship playoffs were the 39th annual single-elimination tournament to determine the national champion of men's NCAA Division III college football. The championship Stagg Bowl game was held at Salem Football Stadium in Salem, Virginia for the 19th time.

Qualification
Twenty-five conferences met the requirements for an automatic ("Pool A") bid to the playoffs. Besides the NESCAC, which does not participate in the playoffs, the UAA had no Pool A bid, failing to meet the seven-member requirement. The ECFC and UMAC received Pool A bids for the first time, having passed through the two-year waiting period.

Schools not in Pool A conferences were eligible for Pool B. The number of Pool B bids was determined by calculating the ratio of Pool A conferences to schools in those conferences and applying that ratio to the number of Pool B schools. The 25 Pool A conferences contained 220 schools, an average of 8.8 teams per conference. Nine schools were in Pool B, enough for one bid.

The remaining six playoff spots were at-large ("Pool C") teams.

Playoff bracket

* Overtime

See also
2011 NCAA Division I FBS football season
2011 NCAA Division I FCS football season
2011 NCAA Division II football season

References